All This and Heaven Too is the third album by singer-songwriter Andrew Gold, released in 1978 on Asylum Records. It includes the hit singles "Never Let Her Slip Away" (a no. 5 entry on the UK Singles Chart) and "Thank You for Being a Friend" (a no. 25 entry on the Billboard singles chart).

Background 
All This and Heaven Too reached the British Top Five in the albums chart in 1978. "Thank You for Being a Friend" later gained popularity as the theme song for The Golden Girls, though it was performed by Cynthia "Cindy" Fee, a singer who often recorded advertising jingles, for the show. Gold also became known for his biggest UK hit song, "Never Let Her Slip Away," which was a No. 5 chart hit in the UK; Freddie Mercury assisted Gold as an uncredited background singer on the track.

Track listing 
All songs written by Andrew Gold, except where noted.

Charts

Personnel 
 Andrew Gold – lead vocals, backing vocals (1, 2, 4, 6, 9, 10), acoustic piano (1, 2, 3, 5, 6, 8, 9, 10), guitar solo (1), percussion (1, 4, 5, 6, 9, 10), clavinet (2), synthesizers (2, 4, 6), guitars (3, 5, 7, 8, 10), electric piano (7, 8, 10), harmonium (7), timpani (7), bass (8), drums (8), acoustic guitar (9), lead guitar (9)
 Waddy Wachtel – guitars (1, 6), electric rhythm guitar (9)
 Kenny Edwards – bass (1, 5, 6, 9), backing vocals (6)
 Leland Sklar – bass (2)
 Brad Palmer – bass (10)
 Rick Marotta – drums (1)
 Russ Kunkel – drums (2)
 Jeff Porcaro – drums (5, 6, 9)
 Beau Segal – drums (10)
 Stix Akimbo – percussion (8)
 Ernie Watts – saxophone (4)
 David Campbell – string and woodwind arrangements, conductor
 Brock Walsh – backing vocals (1, 4, 6, 9, 10), percussion (4)
 J. D. Souther – backing vocals (4)
 Mark Safan – backing vocals (9)
 Jennifer Warnes – backing vocals (9)

Production 
 Andrew Gold – producer 
 Brock Walsh – co-producer
 Dennis Kirk – engineer
 Greg Ladanyi – engineer
 Peter Granet – recording (8)
 George Ybarra – assistant engineer
 Bernie Grundman – mastering 
 A&M Studios (Hollywood, California) – mastering location 
 Melanie McDowell – production assistant 
 John Kosh – art direction, design 
 David Alexander – cover photography 
 Charles William Bush – sleeve photography 
 Norman Epstein – management

References

 http://www.answers.com/topic/andrew-gold

1978 albums
Andrew Gold albums
Pop albums by American artists
albums produced by Andrew Gold
Albums arranged by David Campbell (composer)
Asylum Records albums